This list of tallest buildings in Regina ranks skyscrapers in the city of Regina, Saskatchewan, Canada by height. The tallest building in Regina is the Mosaic Potash Tower, which rises 84.5 m (277 ft). Regina is the capital city of Saskatchewan.

, there are 3 high-rises under construction, approved for construction, and proposed for construction in Regina.

Buildings
This list ranks buildings in Regina that stand at least 30 m (98.4 ft) tall, based on CTBUH height measurement standards. This includes spires and architectural details but does not include antenna masts.

Timeline of tallest buildings

Projects
List of high-rise buildings under construction, approved, proposed and on-hold in Regina.

See also

 Canadian Centre for Architecture
 Society of Architectural Historians
 Canadian architecture
 List of tallest buildings in Canada
 List of tallest buildings in Regina
 List of tallest buildings in Winnipeg

References

External links

 Emporis.com
 saskMAPS.ca interactive tallest buildings map

Regina
Tallest buildings in Regina